Parmu Nature Reserve is a nature reserve which is located in Võru County, Estonia.

The area of the nature reserve is 990 ha.

The protected area was founded in 2006 to protect valuable habitat types and threatened species in Kiviora, Muraski, Parmu, Pupli and Ritsiko village (all in Rõuge Parish).

References

Nature reserves in Estonia
Geography of Võru County